Lecanomancy (Gr. λεκάνη, "dish, pan" + μαντεία, "divination") is a form of divination using a dish, usually of water, which, like many ancient forms of divination, has multiple forms.

The earliest form of lecanomancy appears to have come from Ancient Babylonia, though it is only mentioned in one text. Even there, there were two types of the divination used. Some court magicians would use inductive lecanomancy; whereby the magician or priest would observe patterns of oil within water to predict the future. However, intuitive lecanomany is thought to have developed out of this, which merely required the magician to interpret ripples on the water through meditation.

There are also reports of inductive lecanomany being used by the Mesopotamians, though they sometimes substituted flour for oil.

In the Old Testament a form of lecanomancy was apparently used by Joseph in Egypt (Genesis 44:5,"Isn’t this the cup my master drinks from and also uses for divination? This is a wicked thing you have done.’”) 

The Catawba people used an entirely different system of divination, which is still classified as lecanomany, whereby a bowl of water was placed by a deceased person's head. On the third day of the bowl being present, the deceased's family would watch the bowl for ripples and these would be interpreted to determine the whereabouts of the deceased's soul.

In medieval Europe, lecanomancy was described as clear glass bowls being filled with water to determine the future. This is in stark contrast with earlier forms of the divination, which used clay bowls or basins.

Other forms of lecanomancy throughout history involved dropping a rock in water and interpreting the ripples in the water. In yet another form, demons were thought to enter the water whose ripples were being interpreted, and were forced to answer questions by the scryer.

See also
Hydromancy
Psychomanteum
Scyphomancy

References

External links
 English dictionary
 Mystica
 Tiscali

Divination